JBSP may refer to:
Journal of the British Society for Phenomenology
Jantantrik Bahujan Samaj Party
Jai Bharat Samanta Party